Pierre-Antoine Baudouin (17 October 1723 – 15 December 1769) was a French painter working in the style of his father-in-law, François Boucher.

Life
The son of Michel Baudouin, an engraver of little note, he was born in Paris in 1723. He was a pupil and imitator of Boucher, whose younger daughter he married in 1758, and through whose influence he was elected an Academician in 1763, as a miniature painter, on which occasion he presented his drawing of Hyperides pleading the cause of Phryne before the Areopagus, now in the Louvre. Baudouin executed idyllic and erotic subjects in water-colours and crayons, but rarely painted in oil. He died in Paris in 1769.

References

Sources
 

1723 births
1769 deaths
Painters from Paris
18th-century French painters
French male painters
18th-century French male artists